Santa Fe Marshal is a 1940 American Western film directed by Lesley Selander, written by Harrison Jacobs, and starring William Boyd, Russell Hayden, Marjorie Rambeau, Bernadene Hayes, Earle Hodgins, Britt Wood and Kenneth Harlan. It was released on January 26, 1940, by Paramount Pictures.

Plot

Cast 
 William Boyd as Hopalong Cassidy
 Russell Hayden as Lucky Jenkins
 Marjorie Rambeau as Ma Burton
 Bernadene Hayes as Paula Tate
 Earle Hodgins as Doc Rufus Tate 
 Britt Wood as Axel
 Kenneth Harlan as Blake
 William Pagan as Flint
 George Anderson as Tex Barnes
 Jack Rockwell as John Gardner
 Eddie Dean as Town Marshal

References

External links 
 
 
 
 

1940 films
American black-and-white films
1940s English-language films
Films directed by Lesley Selander
Paramount Pictures films
American Western (genre) films
1940 Western (genre) films
Hopalong Cassidy films
1940s American films